Indautxu is a station on lines 1 and 2 of the Bilbao metro. The station is located in the neighborhood of Indautxu, in the district of Abando. The station is located next to an underground shopping mall by the Indautxu Plaza. It opened on 11 November 1995.

Station layout 

Indautxu station follows the typical cavern-shaped layout of most underground Metro Bilbao stations designed by Norman Foster, with the main hall located directly above the rail tracks.

Access 

  Indautxu Plaza (Urquijo exit, closed during the night time services)
  33 Areilza St. (Areilza exit)
   24 Areilza St. (Areilza exit)

Services 
The station is served by line 1 from Etxebarri to Ibarbengoa and Plentzia, and by line 2 from Basauri to Kabiezes.

References

External links
 

Line 1 (Bilbao metro) stations
Line 2 (Bilbao metro) stations
Buildings and structures in Bilbao
Railway stations in Spain opened in 1995
1995 establishments in the Basque Country (autonomous community)